Helinä Häkkänen-Nyholm (born 26 April 1971 in Helsinki) is a Finnish psychologist who has studied narcissism and psychopathy and wrote the first Finnish textbook on the subject, Psykopatia. Working as both a criminal psychologist and an associate professor, at the University of Helsinki, Häkkänen-Nyholm studies behavior and the risk factors associated with it. She is considered one of Finland's chief experts in forensic psychiatry and has a prolific publishing record.

Selected works
"Psychopathy, Homicide, and the Courts: Working the System" Criminal Justice and Behavior, Vol. 36 No. 8 (August 2009), pp 761–777
"Finnish sexual homicides: Offence and offender characteristics" Forensic Science International,  Vol. 188 No. 1 (2009), pp 125–130
"Homicides with Mutilation of the Victim's Body" Journal of Forensic Sciences, Vol. 54 No. 4 (July 2009), pp 933–937
"Gender differences in Finnish homicide offence characteristics"  Forensic Science International, Vol. 186 No. 1 (2009), pp 75–80
Psychopathy in Families: Implications for Clinical Interviews and Civil Proceedings Wiley Online Library
Psychopathy in Economical Crime, Organized Crime, and War Crimes Wiley Online Library
Psychopathy and law: a practitioner's guide Malden, Massachusetts: Wiley-Blackwell (2012)

External links
 WorldCat Publications List

References

1971 births
Living people
Finnish women writers
Finnish psychologists
Finnish women psychologists
Academic staff of the University of Helsinki